Calvin W. Rolark (October 23, 1994) was an American newspaper publisher and activist. Based in Washington, D.C., Rolark founded The Washington Informer and the United Black Fund.

Early life and education 
Calvin W. Rolark, Jr., was born in Texarkana, Texas, circa 1927. He received a bachelor's of business administration from Prairie View College (now called Prairie View A&M University) and also attended Tennessee State University, Michigan State University, and Cornell University. He lived in Memphis, Tennessee, in the 1940s, where he worked as an editor of the Memphis World.

Career 
Rolark moved from Texas to Washington in either 1952 or 1959. He founded The Washington Informer, a newspaper, in 1962. In 1969, he founded the United Black Fund, a foundation structured similarly to United Way that supported charitable activities for Black and Latino residents in the Washington, D.C., area. Rolark was also affiliated with the United Planning Organization, a charity.

Personal life 
Rolark married Wilhelmina Rolark, a Washington politician, in 1963. According to The Washington Post, Wilhelmina and Calvin were "one of the District's preeminent power couples".

References

Sources

External links 
 

1920s births
1994 deaths
People from Texarkana, Texas
Prairie View A&M University alumni